Johann Gottfried Zinn (December 6, 1727 – April 6, 1759) was a German anatomist and botanist and was a member of the Berlin Academy.

Biography 
Johann Gottfried Zinn was born in Schwabach. Considering his short life span, Zinn made a great contribution to the study of anatomy. In his book Descriptio anatomica oculi humani, he provided the first detailed and comprehensive anatomy of the human eye.

In 1753 Johann Gottfried Zinn became director of the Botanic garden of the University of Göttingen, and in 1755, professor in the medical faculty.

In 1757 Zinn described the orchid genus Epipactis that belongs to the family Orchidaceae.

He died in Göttingen.

Eponyms 
Botanist Carl Linnaeus designated a genus of flowers in the family Asteraceae native from Mexico as Zinnia in his honour.

He coined the anatomic terms:
 Zonula ciliaris Zinnii, now called Zonule of Zinn
 Anulus tendineus communis also known as Annulus of Zinn (or Circle of Zinn).

Works 
 A description of the flora around Göttingen 1753.
 Descriptio anatomica oculi humani iconibus illustrata 1765.

References 

1727 births
1759 deaths
18th-century German botanists
Members of the Prussian Academy of Sciences
People from Schwabach
People from the Principality of Ansbach
Academic staff of the University of Göttingen